La Moille Township is one of twenty-five townships in Bureau County, Illinois, USA. As of the 2020 census, its population was 1,010 and it contained 475 housing units.

La Moille Township was named after the Lamoille River valley in Vermont.

Geography

Cities
 La Moille (west three-quarters)

Unincorporated towns
 Van Orin

Cemeteries
The township contains four cemeteries:
 Greenfield
 North Prairie
 Union
 Van Orin Repose

Major highways
  US Route 34
  Illinois Route 89
  Illinois Route 92

Demographics 
As of the 2020 census there were 1,010 people, 430 households, and 287 families residing in the township. The racial makeup of the township was 93.47% White, 0.20% African American, 0.40% Native American, 0.20% Asian, 0.10% Pacific Islander, 0.69% from other races, and 4.95% from two or more races. Hispanic or Latino of any race were 5.05% of the population.

There were 430 households, out of which 26.70% had children under the age of 18 living with them, 60.47% were married couples living together, 4.65% had a female householder with no spouse present, and 33.26% were non-families. 26.70% of all households were made up of individuals, and 13.50% had someone living alone who was 65 years of age or older. The average household size was 2.49 and the average family size was 3.09.

The township's age distribution consisted of 21.5% under the age of 18, 10.3% from 18 to 24, 18.7% from 25 to 44, 28% from 45 to 64, and 21.5% who were 65 years of age or older. The median age was 44.6 years. For every 100 females, there were 100.0 males. For every 100 females age 18 and over, there were 115.3 males.

The median income for a household in the township was $71,875, and the median income for a family was $80,885. Males had a median income of $39,000 versus $27,450 for females. The per capita income for the township was $35,262. About 1.0% of families and 3.1% of the population were below the poverty line, including 3.9% of those under age 18 and 6.1% of those age 65 or over.

School districts
 La Moille Community Unit School District 303

Political districts
 Illinois's 16th congressional district
 State House District 76
 State Senate District 38

References
 
 US Census Bureau 2007 TIGER/Line Shapefiles
 United States National Atlas

External links
 City-Data.com
 Illinois State Archives

Townships in Bureau County, Illinois
Populated places established in 1849
Townships in Illinois
1849 establishments in Illinois